I, Monarch is the third studio album by Florida technical death metal band Hate Eternal and it was released June 28, 2005 on Earache Records.

Track listing
All songs by Erik Rutan except when noted.

 "Two Demons" – 03:55
 "Behold Judas" (Piro, Rutan) – 04:21
 "The Victorious Reign" – 03:38
 "To Know Our Enemies" – 04:15
 "I, Monarch" – 04:37
 "Path to the Eternal Gods" (Rutan, Roddy) – 03:28
 "The Plague of Humanity" – 04:02
 "It Is Our Will" (Rutan, Roddy) – 04:41
 "Sons of Darkness" (Piro, Rutan) – 04:56
 "Faceless One" – 04:39

Personnel 
Hate Eternal
 Erik Rutan - guitars, vocals
 Derek Roddy - drums
 Randy Piro - bass
Artwork
 Paul Romano - art direction, artwork & design

References 

2005 albums
Hate Eternal albums
Albums produced by Erik Rutan
Earache Records albums